CKPC may refer to:

 CKPC (AM), a radio station (1380 AM) licensed to Brantford, Ontario, Canada
 CKPC-FM, a radio station (92.1 FM) licensed to Brantford, Ontario, Canada